Alfred Zima (born 23 August 1931) was an Austrian boxer. He competed in the men's flyweight event at the 1952 Summer Olympics.

References

External links
 

1931 births
Possibly living people
Austrian male boxers
Olympic boxers of Austria
Boxers at the 1952 Summer Olympics
Place of birth missing (living people)
Flyweight boxers